Charbhadrasan or Char Bhadrasan is an upazila of Faridpur District in the Division of Dhaka, Bangladesh.

Geography
It has 12415 households and total area 141.59 km2.
The Geographical position:
Charbhadrasan size of a small area. Padma was happy to note that it depends on the size and range. North - South travel through the Dohar Upazila, Louhajang Upazila, Harirampur Upazila in the east - Sadarpur Upazila the south, in the south - west of Nagarkanda Upazila and west - north - Faridpur Sadar Upazila.

Demographics
As of the 1991 Bangladesh census, Charbhadrasan has a population of 69876. Males constitute 51.36% of the population, and females 48.64%. This Upazila's eighteen up population is 34758. Charbhadrasan has an average literacy rate of 20.5% (7+ years), and the national average of 32.4% literate.

Administration
Charbhadrasan thana was established in 1914 at Charsalehpur. It was turned into an upazila in 1983.

Charbhadrasan Upazila is divided into four union parishads: Charbhadrasan, Char Harirampur, Char Jahukanda, and Gazirtek. The union parishads are subdivided into 24 mauzas and 80 villages.

Education
Charbhadrasan Government College

See also
Upazilas of Bangladesh
Districts of Bangladesh
Divisions of Bangladesh
Char Bhadrasan massacre, 1971 massacre of Hindu residents by the Pakistan army

References

Upazilas of Faridpur District